Para is a village in Kekri district, in Rajasthan state of India. As of 2011 census of India, its population is 3752.

It is located at a distance of 408 km from the Indian capital New Delhi, 148 km from the Rajasthan capital Jaipur, 92 km from the district headquarter Ajmer and 12 km from the tehsil headquarter Kekri.

Toponymy
There is a legend associated with the origin of the name Para. It says that the name Para came from the name of Lord Shiva temple which is situated at the southern corner of the village which is called as Pareshwar Nath Temple. The name Pareshwar eroded gradually to become what is now as Para. one temple also Laxminath mandir this temple have also same feeling like pareshwar Madhav in village .

Geography

It has an average elevation of 440 meters.

Demographics
As of 2011, Para had a population of 3752 According to census of 2011.The majority of population is Hindu which accounts for over 99%, with a few Muslim and Jains The overall literacy rate for the village is 44.45%. 59.14% males and 28.99% females were literate. The sex ratio was 950 females per 1,000 males.

Transport
Para is situated on the state highway RJ SH 26 which connects two major cities of Rajasthan Ajmer and Kota. Regular bus service from Rajasthan State Road Transport Corporation ltd is available from New Delhi, Bhopal, Ujjain, Indore, Ajmer, Kota, Bhilwara, Udaipur, Nagore, Bikaner, Jodhpur and other major cities.

References 

Villages in Ajmer district